Fibuloides rusticola is a species of moth of the family Tortricidae first described by Józef Razowski in 2013. It is found on Seram Island in Indonesia. The habitat consists of bamboo and secondary forests.

References

Moths described in 2013
Enarmoniini